The Coupe de France 1986–87 was its 70th edition. It was won by Girondins de Bordeaux which defeated Olympique de Marseille in the Final.

Round of 16

Quarter-finals

Semi-finals
First round

Second round

Final

References

French federation

1986–87 domestic association football cups
1986–87 in French football
1986-87